A paleoshoreline (ancient shoreline) is a shoreline which existed in the geologic past. (Paleo is from an ancient Greek word meaning "old" or "ancient".) A perched coastline is an ancient (fossil) shoreline positioned above the present shoreline.

Tides cause the ocean to advance and recede in a very short time scale, in most places about twice per day; weather conditions can also cause short-term variations. Coastlines can also move due to coastal erosion, without a change in sea level. But "sea level" refers to the average level over a relatively long period (years). This average sea level can advance and recede over much longer periods (thousands or millions of years), causing paleoshorelines which may be difficult to identify.

That entire time, humans have lived in North America.

A lake may also have a paleoshoreline.

Paleoshorelines have also been inferred on Mars; see Burgsvik Beds and Martian dichotomy.

Scientific importance

Paleoshorelines capture valuable records of environmental change and can tell us about modern shelf ecosystems. These structures can indicate distributions of seabed features that are habitats of marine life; they may also reveal the location of coastal resources once used by humans, of archaeological significance.

Examples

 The Bering Land Bridge once stood above water, and the commonest explanation of early human presence in the Americas is that the Native Americans came over this land bridge. Now it is under water.
 Once Doggerland, an area of the North Sea, stood above water, connecting Great Britain to the rest of Europe.
 In a sudden event, the 1700 Cascadia earthquake caused the coastline of what are now British Columbia, Washington, Oregon and north California to "drop several feet".
 In Asia, the Yonaguni Monument, a submerged rock formation near the Ryukyu Islands, once stood above sea level; whether the formations are human-made is still argued.

See also

 List of ancient oceans
 List of prehistoric lakes
 Palaeochannel
 Perched coastline
 Raised beach

References

External links and references

 Paleoshoreline research
 Paleoshoerlines of Pacific islands
 Paleoshorelines off Australia
 Shelf sand supply determined by glacial-age sea-level modes, submerged coastlines and wave climate
 Paleoshorelines off Tonga
 Paleoshoreline evidence for postglacial tilting in Southern Manitoba
 Paleoshorelines of Florida, USA
 Submerged Shorelines in the Southern California Borderland
 Paleoshorelines of Mono Lake, California, USA

Physical geography

Bodies of water

Paleogeography